Shenzhou 1 launched on 19 November 1999, was the first uncrewed launch of the Shenzhou spacecraft. The spacecraft used was not equipped with a life support system or an emergency escape system. After orbiting the Earth 14 times, the command for retrofire was sent by the Yuan Wang 3 tracking ship off the coast of Namibia at 18:49 UTC.

The first Shenzhou spacecraft was different from those later used. Instead of featuring unfolding solar panels, Shenzhou 1 was equipped with fixed solar cells. During this first flight there were also no orbit changes. According to Qi Faren, the chief designer of the spacecraft, only 8 of the 13 sub-systems on board the spacecraft were operational. Shenzhou 1 was designed primarily to test the Long March 2F rocket. The only systems and capabilities tested on the spacecraft were the separation of the modules, attitude control, lifting body reentry, the heat shield, and ground recovery.

The spacecraft is thought to have carried  of seeds to investigate the effects on them of the space environment. It is also thought that the front of the Orbital module was equipped with a dummy ELINT package, with Shenzhou 2 onwards equipped with fully functional models.

It was announced in June 1999 that the flight would take place in October of that year. At about the same time images were released on a Chinese military internet forum of the Long March 2F launcher and the Vehicle Assembly Building that would be used. After a reported propellant explosion at the Jiuquan Satellite Launch Center (though the explosion was denied by Chinese officials) the launch was pushed back.

Mission parameters 

 NSSDC ID: 1999-061A
 Mass: 7600 kg
 Perigee: 195 km
 Apogee: 315 km
 Inclination: 42.6°
 Period: 89.6 minutes

See also 

 Chinese space program
 Tiangong program
 Shenzhou spacecraft
 Long March rocket
 Jiuquan Satellite Launch Center

References 
 

 

 

 

 

Shenzhou 01
Spacecraft launched in 1999
1999 in China